Rodger Brulotte (Born January 4, 1947 in Montreal) is a Major League Baseball broadcaster.

His career with the Montreal Expos organization started in 1969, working in sales and marketing. He contributed to the creation of the Youppi mascot. In 1984, he was hired by CKAC to serve as Color commentator alongside Jacques Doucet.

In 1990, he moved to RDS where he called Expos games with his colleague Denis Casavant until the team's demise in 2004. He is famous for the line "Bonsoir, elle est partie!" (Good night, it is gone) which he said when the Expos hit a home run.  Brulotte and Casavant continued to call baseball games on RDS, though coverage is now limited. He now calls Toronto Blue Jays games on TVA Sports alongside Doucet.

He writes an article entitled “Tout partout” in Le Journal de Montréal. Brulotte was nominated for a Gemini Award in 1991 and 1993. He is member of the organization Encore Baseball Montreal, which promotes baseball to the young people of Montréal.

References

1947 births
Living people
Montreal Expos announcers
Toronto Blue Jays announcers
Canadian radio sportscasters
Sportspeople from Montreal
Major League Baseball broadcasters
Baseball people from Quebec